Mount Ellinor is a peak in the Olympic Mountains of Washington, United States. It is located in an area designated as the Mount Skokomish Wilderness.

There are two trailheads, both of which are accessed from National Forest Road 24 north of Lake Cushman.

History
In 1853, surveyor George Davidson named the mountain after Ellinor Fauntleroy, his fiancé. Additionally, Davidson named The Brothers after Ellinor's two brothers, and Mount Constance after her older sister.

The first American settlers to climb Mount Ellinor were D.N. Utler, Mr. and Mrs. J.W. Waughop, and H.C. Esteps, in August 1879.

View
Mount Ellinor offers a variety of views of all the major Cascade peaks, as well as close-range views of neighboring Mount Washington, Stone, Pershing, and a glimpse of Mount Olympus in the distance. Additionally, views of Lake Cushman, the Hood Canal and the Puget Sound abound.

References

External links
 
 

Mountains of Mason County, Washington
Mountains of Washington (state)
Olympic Mountains